The  was a battle of the Boshin War, which occurred on July 4, 1868 (Meiji 1, 15th day of the 5th month), between the troops of the Shōgitai under Shibusawa Seiichirō and Amano Hachirō, and Imperial "Kangun" troops.

Prelude
Though the Shōgitai was mostly made up of former Tokugawa retainers and residents of the surrounding provinces, some domains supported the Shōgitai, such as Takada han (Echigo Province, 150,000 koku), Obama han (Wakasa Province, 103,000 koku), Takasaki han (Kōzuke Province, 52,000 koku), and Yūki han (Shimosa Province, 18,000 koku). 

Facing them were the combined forces of the Chōshū, Ōmura, Sadowara, Hizen, Chikugo, Owari, Bizen, Tsu, Inaba, and Higo domains, under the general command of Chōshū's Ōmura Masujirō. 

Shibusawa and Amano initially had the 2000-strong Shōgitai posted in Ueno to protect Tokugawa Yoshinobu, who was, at the time, in self-imposed confinement at Ueno's Kan'ei-ji Temple, as well as Prince Rinnōji no Miya Yoshihisa, who was the abbot of the temple, and was to become the new dynastic leader of the Tokugawa resistance as "Emperor Tōbu".

From their base, the Shogitai had been harassing Imperial troops, creating trouble in Edo, thus forcing the Imperial side, although outnumbered, to take action.

Battle

The Shōgitai took up positions around Kan'ei-ji (寛永寺; an important Tokugawa family temple) and the nearby Nezu Shrine (根津神社). When the battle began, the forces of Satsuma, led by Saigō Takamori, attacked head-on at the gate, but were stopped by the Shogitai forces, which were superior in number. The Satsuma forces suffered heavy casualties, until the forces of Choshu managed to make a second attack from the rear, which unblocked the tactical stalemate. While the Shogitai put up stiff resistance, the Tosa troops also used Armstrong cannons and Snider guns to devastating effect, thus ending the last center of resistance in Edo. According to Saigō Takamori:

 

Rinnōji no Miya escaped, reached Enomoto Takeaki's warship Chogei-maru and was dropped off further north, on the Pacific coast. Harada Sanosuke of the Shinsengumi is said to have joined the Shōgitai, and died soon after this battle. About 300 Shogitai are said to have died in the battle, and a thousand houses were burnt in collateral damages.

References

Further reading
Kikuchi Akira. Shinsengumi Hyakuichi no Nazo. Tōkyō: Shin Jinbutsu Ōraisha, 2000.
Mori Mayumi. Shōgitai Ibun. Tōkyō: Shinkōsha, 2004.
Steele, M. William. Against the Restoration. Katsu Kaishu's Attempt to Reinstate the Tokugawa Family. Monumenta Nipponica, Vol. 36, No. 3. (Autumn, 1981), pp. 299–316.
Steele, M. William. Edo in 1868: The View from Below. Monumenta Nipponica, Vol. 45, No. 2. (Summer, 1990), pp. 127–155.
Takano Kiyoshi. Tokugawa Yoshinobu: Gendai Nihon no Enshutsusha. Tōkyō: Nihon Hōsō Shuppan Kyōkai, 1997.
Yamakawa Kenjiro. Aizu Boshin Senshi. Tokyo: Tokyo Daigaku Shuppankai, 1931.

1868 in Japan
Boshin War
Ueno
Ueno
Ueno, Tokyo
Ueno
July 1868 events
Incidents in the history of Buddhism in Japan